Love Expresso is a 2007 Spanish comedy film directed and written by Álvaro Díaz Lorenzo. The cast features Alejo Sauras, Lucía Jiménez, Asier Etxeandia, Elena Ballesteros, Diego Paris, Javier Godino, Inma Cuesta and Terele Pávez.

Plot 
The plot concerns the dating experiences of a group of emotionally incompetent males close to their 30s.

Cast

Production 
The film was produced by Drive Cine and Estudios Picasso and it had the participation of Telecinco.

Release 
The film screened in March 2014 at the 10th Málaga Film Festival, where it clinched the Audience Award. It was theatrically released in Spain on 29 June 2007. It performed well at the domestic box office, grossing over €2 million upon the first month of its theatrical run and becoming the highest-grossing Spanish release of the year up to that point.

Reception 
Jordi Costa of El País found the film worrying in terms of its status as a debut feature (insofar it was lacking in any sort of fresh look), presenting instead "four stale sitcom archetypes" crossing paths in a "microcosm inhabited by female clichés and extras in need of motivation".

Jonathan Holland of Variety presented the film as a sort of translation to Spain of American film American Pie, featuring "a couple decent comic scenes and two good perfs" rising "above the pop soundtrack, navel-gazing and scatology".

See also 
 List of Spanish films of 2007

References 

2007 comedy films
2007 films
Spanish comedy films
2000s Spanish-language films
Telecinco Cinema films
2000s Spanish films